Francesco Guidolin (born 3 October 1955) is an Italian football manager and former player, most recently the manager of Premier League team Swansea City. He has coached various Italian club sides in Serie A, winning the 1996–97 Coppa Italia with Vicenza, while also competing in European competitions with Vicenza, Udinese, Bologna and Palermo, as well as managing Ligue 1 club Monaco.

Playing career
Guidolin made his professional debut in 1975 with the Serie A club Hellas Verona, with whom he spent the majority of his career, save for loan moves to clubs Sambenedettese, Pistoiese and Bologna. After spending two seasons with Serie C2 club Venezia, he retired in 1986.

Internationally, Guidolin played for the Italy national under-21 team between 1976 and 1977.

Coaching career

Lower Italian leagues
Guidolin's managerial debut came in 1988 as head coach of Serie C2 team Giorgione, the main club of his native city, Castelfranco Veneto. Between 1989 and 1993, he then coached Treviso (Serie C2), Fano, Empoli and Ravenna, all in Serie C1.

Atalanta
Leading Ravenna to promotion to Serie B earned Guidolin a move to become head coach of Serie A club Atalanta on 1 July 1993, although he was sacked after just ten matches.

Vicenza
The next season, Guidolin joined Serie B side Vicenza and restored them following a period of decline. After gaining promotion to Serie A at the end of the 1994–95 Serie B, his club finished mid-table the following Serie A season. During the 1996–97 season, Vicenza led the league for a period, eventually achieving an eighth-place finish in Serie A, and won the 1997 Coppa Italia, defeating Napoli 3–1 on aggregate in the two-legged final. It was the club's first domestic trophy.

As a result, the following season Guidolin had his first European campaign (and Vicenza's second ever), reaching the 1997–98 UEFA Cup Winners' Cup semi-final before losing to eventual winners Chelsea. However, in the league season, Vicenza finished just one place above the relegation zone. The club was also defeated by Juventus in the 1997 Supercoppa Italiana.

Udinese
After managing Vicenza, Guidolin accepted the head coach position at Serie A side Udinese for the 1998–99 season. Their previous third-place finish had qualified them the first round of the 1998–99 UEFA Cup, but they did not progress beyond this stage, losing to Bayer Leverkusen. In the remaining league campaign, Guidolin was only able to guide them to a mid-table finish and was fired only days before the start of the following season.

Bologna
In the middle of the 1999–2000 season, Guidolin joined Serie A side Bologna, a former club as a player. Despite finishing ninth in the previous season, Bologna had qualified for the 1999–2000 UEFA Cup after winning a tie-breaker against Internazionale. Guidolin took them to the third round of the UEFA Cup, where they were eliminated by Galatasaray. In the Serie A season, they finished in 11th place. The following league campaign ended with another ninth-place finish, followed by another small improvement to seventh place and entry into in a summer tournament, the 2002 UEFA Intertoto Cup, where they were defeated in the three-game final stage by Fulham.

The 2002–03 season began with good results but ended in a disappointing 11th-place finish and resulted in heavy criticism of Guidolin, which became more intense after Guidolin was heard insulting the city of Bologna during a match.

Palermo
Guidolin returned to management with Palermo in January 2004, midway through the Serie B season. Playing Luca Toni as a lone striker among experienced players and those cast off from larger teams, he won the division, taking the Sicilians back to the top flight for the first time since 1973. In the subsequent Serie A campaign, he guided Palermo to a sixth-place finish, earning their first ever UEFA Cup qualification. However, he opted to leave the club at the end of the season.

Aborted move to Genoa
For the start of the next season, Guidolin had agreed to join Genoa, who had gained promotion to Serie A from the 2004–05 Serie B. However, after a match fixing scandal over their final league match was discovered, the Italian Football Federation instead placed Genoa last in Serie B, thereby relegating them to Serie C1. As a result, Guidolin rescinded his contract.

Monaco
In October 2005, Guidolin succeeded Didier Deschamps at Ligue 1 club Monaco. He signed a two-year contract in his first managerial post outside Italy. The club finished 10th in his only season.

Return to Palermo
On 30 May 2006, in a surprise move, Guidolin was re-hired by his former club Palermo. In his absence, they had reached the round of 16 in their inaugural UEFA Cup run, and had also qualified for the 2006–07 UEFA Cup despite finishing eighth in the league, due to Italian match fixing scandals costing other clubs their places. Guidolin's Serie A campaign started well, but after losing star player Amauri to injury in December, the team went over two months without a win. In the UEFA Cup, they progressed to the group stage but failed to qualify for the knockout stages, ending their campaign in December.

The season was also disrupted when the club was one of the two teams involved in the Sicilian derby of 2 February 2007 which led to riots and a police fatality, resulting in various safety restrictions being imposed on the league. Having dropped out of the UEFA Champions League qualification places, Guidolin was sacked on 23 April following a 4–3 home defeat to relegation-threatened Parma. After his assistant Renzo Gobbo failed to halt the club's slide, the sacking was revoked on 14 May after two further defeats. After finally finishing fifth and therefore qualifying for the 2007–08 UEFA Cup, Guidolin was sacked again, being replaced by Atalanta coach Stefano Colantuono.

In October 2007, Guidolin declined to take up an offer to coach struggling English Championship side Queens Park Rangers after failing to agree personal terms.

On 26 November 2007, with Palermo having been eliminated from the UEFA Cup in the first round and slipping to ninth place in Serie A, Guidolin was unexpectedly re-appointed by Palermo for a record fourth time, replacing Colantuono. After only gaining 18 points in 17 matches, he was sacked again on 24 March 2008 at the end of a run of three defeats, the latter followed by controversial criticism from him of the fans.

Parma
On 30 September 2008, Guidolin signed a contract with Serie B side Parma, guiding them to second place in the 2008–09 campaign, earning promotion back into the top flight. A good start to the following Serie A season saw the team constantly in the top ten for the first half, before finally ending mid-table. Despite the manner of his departure from Palermo, he is still today hailed as one of the club legends and was warmly welcomed during his return as Parma manager, albeit suffering a late defeat to his old side.

Return to Udinese

After two seasons at Parma, Guidolin resigned in order to take up the head coach position at Serie A side Udinese for a second time, who despite having recent history of European football, had recently finished in 15th place, nine points and three places clear of the relegation zone.

After a poor start to the 2010–11 Serie A season, the team went on to record their highest points total in history and finished in fourth place, earning themselves a spot in the 2011–12 UEFA Champions League qualifying round on the final Serie A matchday. Guidolin kept his promise of "dancing like Boateng" if they qualified, and did a little jig in the middle of the pitch. Later that year, he was awarded the Panchina d'Oro as the best coach of the league.

In the next season, the club were unable to qualify for the Champions League proper after losing to Arsenal, but progressed as far as the round of 16 in the 2011–12 UEFA Europa League, being eliminated by Dutch side AZ. They finished the 2011–12 Serie A in third place, the best result in the club's history, equalling Alberto Zaccheroni's 1996–97 season, again achieving a place in the qualifying round for the 2012–13 UEFA Champions League. In his third season at Udinese, Guidolin again failed to reach the Champions League proper, losing on penalties to Braga, but this time also finished bottom of their group in the 2012–13 UEFA Europa League. In the Serie A table, the club finished fifth, reaching the Europa League qualifying round for a third time.

Pozzo family consultant
On 20 May 2014, Guidolin took the decision to leave coaching, but maintained a link with Udinese by becoming the technical supervisor for the club's chairman Giampaolo Pozzo, thereby also overseeing his two other clubs, Spanish side Granada and English team Watford.

Swansea City
On 18 January 2016, Guidolin was named head coach of Swansea City, at that point struggling in the 2015–16 Premier League, only two points above the relegation zone, to work alongside interim manager Alan Curtis, who took the post of first team coach. While the decision baffled some pundits, the Swansea chairman argued that Guidolin's achievements at Udinese on a relatively small budget were similar to what the club was trying to achieve. At the time of his appointment, Guidolin was virtually unknown to the English game and club captain Ashley Williams later admitted that he had to "Google" his new manager.

Guidolin took charge of his first game on 24 January 2016, an away fixture at Goodison Park which Swansea City won 2–1, recording the club's first-ever league win over Everton. On 1 May, Guidolin mathematically secured Swansea's place in the Premier League for the following season, as the club defeated Liverpool 3–1 at Liberty Stadium. On 11 May 2016, and despite intense speculation and betting that former manager Brendan Rodgers would replace him, Guidolin was invited to sign a new two-year-contract with Swansea after impressing the club's board of directors with his achievements in the late winter and spring of the 2015–16 season.

After a poor start in the Premier League the following season, Guidolin was sacked on 3 October 2016, his 61st birthday, and replaced with immediate effect by former United States national team manager Bob Bradley.

Later years
After his short-lived experience at Swansea, Guidolin moved out of management for good. Since 2018, he is working with DAZN as a football pundit and color commentator.

Style of management
Having won the Panchina d'oro award in 2011, Guidolin is considered one of the best Italian coaches in circulation, and was initially known for using a Sacchi-inspired 4–4–2 formation (or its variant, the 4–4–1–1) towards the beginning of his coaching career. Later, he became known for his versatility and ability to adopt tactical systems which were most suitable to his players. He has also made use of 4–3–2–1, 3–4–1–2, 3–1–4–1–1, or 3–5–2 (or 3–5–1–1) formations throughout his career. Giovanni Cornacchini, who played under Guidolin at Vicenza, described him as the best coach he ever had, and as the manager who was the most prepared on the pitch.

Managerial statistics

Honours

Manager
Ravenna
Serie C1: 1992–93

Vicenza
Coppa Italia: 1996–97

Palermo
Serie B: 2003–04

Individual
Panchina d'Oro: 2011

References

1955 births
Living people
People from Castelfranco Veneto
Italian footballers
Italian expatriate sportspeople in Monaco
Italian football managers
Treviso F.B.C. 1993 managers
Alma Juventus Fano 1906 managers
Empoli F.C. managers
Ravenna F.C. managers
Atalanta B.C. managers
L.R. Vicenza managers
Udinese Calcio managers
Bologna F.C. 1909 managers
Palermo F.C. managers
Genoa C.F.C. managers
AS Monaco FC managers
Parma Calcio 1913 managers
Serie A managers
A.S. Sambenedettese players
U.S. Pistoiese 1921 players
Hellas Verona F.C. players
Bologna F.C. 1909 players
Venezia F.C. players
Italy under-21 international footballers
Serie A players
Serie B players
Serie C players
Expatriate football managers in Monaco
Italian expatriate football managers
Ligue 1 managers
Premier League managers
Italian expatriate sportspeople in Wales
Expatriate football managers in Wales
Association football midfielders
Sportspeople from the Province of Treviso
Footballers from Veneto